Patriarch Alexius may refer to:

 Alexius of Constantinople, Ecumenical Patriarch in 1025–1043
 Patriarch Alexy I of Moscow, ruled in 1945–1970
 Patriarch Alexy II of Moscow, ruled in 1990–2008